Daniele Fruci (born 6 June 1988 in Rome) is an Italian footballer who currently plays as a defender for Pergocrema.

References

External links
 

1988 births
Living people
Footballers from Rome
Italian footballers
Delfino Pescara 1936 players
S.S. Fidelis Andria 1928 players
Celano F.C. Marsica players
S.S.D. Città di Brindisi players
Association football defenders